Red 2G is a synthetic red azo dye. It is soluble in water and slightly soluble in glycerol. It usually comes as a disodium salt of 8-acetamido-1-hydroxy-2-phenylazonaphthalene-3,6 disulfonate.

Uses

Food dye 
In the European Union, Red 2G was used as a food dye (E number E128).  However, it was only permitted for use in breakfast sausages with a minimum cereal content of 6% and burger meat with a minimum vegetable and/or cereal content of 4%.

Following safety concerns raised by EFSA in its opinion of 5 July 2007,  the European Commission has prepared a draft Regulation to suspend use of E128 as a food colouring.  This proposed course of action was unanimously approved by European Union Member States at a meeting of the Standing Committee of the Food Chain and Animal Health (Section Toxicological Safety of the Food Chain) on 20 July 2007. and Commission Regulation (EC) No 884/2007 . on emergency measures suspending the use of E 128 Red 2G as food colour was published in the Official Journal of the European Union on 27 July 2007.

Red 2G is also banned in Australia, Canada, Japan, Norway, and Malaysia. It was banned in Israel in July 2007 .

It is relatively insensitive to the bleaching effect of sulfur dioxide (E220) and sodium metabisulfite (E223). In the intestines, Red 2G can be converted to the toxic compound aniline,  so there are concerns Red 2G may ultimately interfere with blood haemoglobin, as well as cause cancer.

Inks 
It is also used as a dye for coatings, inks, paper, crepe paper, and fine tissue.

Histology 
Red 2G can be also used for staining in histology, though rarely, e.g. as a component of Masson's trichrome.

Potential health risks 
In July 2007, the EFSA established that E128 is potentially carcinogenic because it forms aniline in the body when consumed.  The pressure group, The Food Commission, said there had been concerns about Red 2G going back decades and it was suspected of being a carcinogen in the 1980s.

References 

Azo dyes
Food colorings
Staining dyes
Organic sodium salts
Acetamides
1-Naphthols
Naphthalenesulfonates